Lohne (Oldenburg) (Northern Low Saxon: Lohn) is a town in the district of Vechta, in Lower Saxony, Germany. It is located approximately 8 km south-west of Vechta. The town lies on the A1 freeway between Bremen and Osnabrück.

Geography

Geographical position 
Lohne lies in the Oldenburg Münsterland between Oldenburg to the north and Osnabrück to the south. Through the city goes the Weser-Ems-watershed from north to south. In the east is the catchment area of the Hunte and in the west the catchment area of the Hase, which lies on a Geest, part of the Dammer Berge.

To the east of Lohne lies the Großes Moor, a raised bog. To the west lies the "Dinklager Becken", a great lowland. Drainage occurs by the rivulets "Hopener Mühlenbach" and "Bokerner Bach" into the Hase and "Dadau" into the Hunte.

In the east, next to the "Großes Moor" lie two more raised bogs, the "Brägeler Moor" and the "Südlohner Moor". The "Südlohner Moor" is a protected landscape. A small part of the "Steinfelder Moor" is protected too. It lies in Kroge-Ehrendorf, south of the federal road B214.

Districts

Neighbourship of Lohne 
The neighbourship of Lohne, clockwise, start in the north:

 The city Vechta (District Vechta) 
 The municipality Barnstorf (District Diepholz) 
 The municipality Drebber (District Diepholz) 
 The city Diepholz (District Diepholz)
 The municipality Steinfeld (District Vechta)
 The municipality Holdorf (District Vechta)
 The city Dinklage (District Vechta) 
 The municipality Bakum (District Vechta)

The distance is town center to town center.

Twin towns – sister cities

Lohne is twinned with:
 Rixheim, France (1987)
 Międzylesie, Poland (2010)

Economy 
As a "city of special industries", Lohne has also made a name for itself nationwide. As early as 1900, Lohne had an injection moulding factory, a machine factory, two paintbrush and one brush factories, a mechanical weaving mill, a sausage factory, several brickworks including cement industry, a peat factory, a cardboard packaging factory and a large number of other production facilities. Lohne's industry was characterized less by size than by its specialization. Since the 1950s, the plastics industry has been the mainstay of the Lohner economy. Today, metalworking companies, machinery and equipment manufacturers, packaging and cartonboard companies, cork manufacturers, as well as the food industry, agriculture and the construction trades ensure that there is a wide variety of industries in Lohne.

The fact that Lohne, as a middle center, is in the same order as the middle center of Vechta, the capital of the district, is shown by the fact, that most of the professional schools in the district are located in Lohne.

Every Thursday and Saturday there is a weekly market on the "Alter Markt", occasionally also on the "Rixheimer Platz".

Plastic industries 
Established plastic industries in Lohne are:
 ATKA Kunststoffverarbeitung
 delo Dettmer-Verpackungen
 Franz Henke Kunststoffwerk & Werkzeugbau
 Kronen-Hansa-Werk
 Nowack
 Polytec Rießelmann
 Pöppelmann
 RPC Bramlage

Other companies 
Lohne has a wide range of small, medium and large companies. These are for example:
 EnviTec Biogas AG (producer for biogas plants)
 PHW Group (biggest German poultry farmer and producer)
 Würth

Transport 
Lohne lies on the A1 freeway (European route E 37) between Bremen and Osnabrück. It can be reached via the exit Lohne / Dinklage.

The train station lies on the Delmenhorst–Hesepe railway, which is operated by the NordWestBahn. Trains run every hour as RB 58 to Osnabrück and Bremen. Until 1999, a Lohne-Dinklage narrow-gauge railway was in operation; passenger transport ended in 1954. Meanwhile, most of the tracks have been converted into a bike path. In November 2013, the call bus system "Moobilplus Vechta" was put into operation in the district of Vechta, in which Lohne is involved. Every hour a bus operates between Dinklage, Lohne and the Lohner municipality Märschendorf.

Other buses run, including "Weser-Ems-Buses", for example to Damme and Diepholz.

From the 1920s there were plans to build a channel called "Hansakanal". It would pass through the middle of Lohne, and would connect the Rhine-Ruhr metropolitan region with the seaports of Bremen and Hamburg. In 1950 the plan was finally abandoned.

The nearest international airports are Bremen Airport (80 km north) and Münster Osnabrück International Airport (80 km south).

Lohne has a fast charging station from Tesla, the Tesla Supercharger.

Population development

Culture and sights

Theatre 
 Freilichtbühne Lohne
 Musical AG of the Lohner high school
 Theatregroup of the Schützenverein Bokern-Märschendorf
 Theaterring Lohne e. V.

Notable places 
 Lohne Museum of Industry (opened in March 2000)
 St.-Gertrud-Church with impressive high altar
 St.-Anna-Klus (pilgrimage church) with healing spring
 "Patoratsmühle" (historical water mill at the city park)
 Windmill „Elbers Mühle“
 Outlook tower at the forest park
 Moated castle Hopen
 Urban Villas (Villa Clodius, Villa Taphorn, Villa Trenkamp, Villa Trenkamp and Bohmann, Haus Uptmoor)

Outdoor artwork  
 Bronze sculpture „Gänseliesel“ (Hans-Gerd Ruwe, 1978)
 Bronze sculpture „Begegnung“ (Holger Voigts, 1986)
 Fountain sculpture „EGOLOHNE 88“ (Jürgen Goertz, 1988)
 Bronze sculpture „Mantelmadonna“ (Judith von Eßen, 1991)
 Acacia wood sculpture „Gestern – Heute – Morgen“ (Jacques Muhlenbach, 1992)
 Dimension stone sculpture  „Zwei Stühle-Thron“ (Rudolf Kaiser, 1992)
 Diabase sculpture „Lohner Wasserstein“ (Wolf Bröll, 1992)
 Bronze fountain sculpture „Das tapfere Schneiderlein“ (Bernhard Kleinhans, 1992)
 Clay sculpture „Befreite Formen“ and marble sculpture „Magisches Quadrat“ (Wolfgang Roßdeutscher, 1992 and 1993)
 Bronze sculpture „Disput“ (Bernd Altenstein, 2009)
 Steel sculpture „Jede Menge Leute“ (Werner Berges, 2012)
 Steel sculpture at the „Lohneum“ (Alfred Bullermann, 2018)
 other sculptures throughout the city

1992 Lohne organized a Sculptor symposium. Many sculptures in Lohne are the result of it.

In the area of the town are more than 100 Wayside crosses.

Notable people
Claus Peter Poppe (born 1948), politician (SPD), member of Lower Saxony Landtag 2003–2014
Johannes Schmoelling (born 1950), musician
Benno Möhlmann (born 1954), football player and manager
Ulrich Kirchhoff (born 1967), show jumper, Olympic champion
Erik Pfeifer (born 1987), boxer, German champion

Honorary citizens
Honorary citizenship is the highest honour Lohne has to offer. Only three citizens have received this award:
Helmut Göttke-Krogmann (1919–2008), former voluntary mayor (1972–1991)
Hans Diekmann (born 1938), former voluntary mayor (1991–2001)
Hans-Georg Niesel (born 1944), former town director (1979–2001) and full-time mayor (2001–2011)

Politics

City council

(as of 11 November 2016)

By German law, cities between 25,001 and 30,000 citizens must have 36 town councils (German Stadträte). Lohne has only 35. The party AFD won 2 seats for the city council, but only one candidate on their ticket. The 2nd seat was withdrawn. The legislative period will take 5 years.

Mayor

In 2011, Tobias Gerdesmeyer was elected as mayor (CDU). He was common representative for the mayor (2008–2011) before he succeeded Hans Georg Niesel (mayor 2001–2011) as mayor.

Coat of arms
On 3 January 1912, the Grand duke of Oldenburg granted the Coat of arms. The shield is divided into four quarters (party per quarterly). The upper left quarter shows gold and red fesses, the lower right quarter shows a golden cross on blue ground. They are the same as in the Coat of arms of the Grand duke. The upper right quarter shows a church on white ground. It displays the modest character of Lohne in union with the Catholic Church. The lower left square shows a wing on a crown. The crown is symbolic of wage and price of the bourgeois activity (Lohn und Preis der bürgerlichen Regsamkeit). The wing is symbolic of the significant feather industry in Lohne in the early 19th century.

References

External links

  

Vechta (district)